Nevada's 12th Senate district is one of 21 districts in the Nevada Senate. It has been represented by Republican Joe Hardy since 2010.

Geography
District 12 covers the southern and eastern exurbs of Las Vegas in Clark County, including Mesquite, Bunkerville, Moapa Valley, Boulder City, Laughlin, and parts of Henderson and the Fort Mojave Indian Reservation. The district is home to the Hoover Dam.

The district overlaps with Nevada's 3rd and 4th congressional districts, and with the 19th and 23rd districts of the Nevada Assembly. It borders the states of Arizona and California.

Recent election results
Nevada Senators are elected to staggered four-year terms; since 2012 redistricting, the 12th district has held elections in midterm years.

2018

2014

Federal and statewide results in District 12

References 

12
Clark County, Nevada